Jayakwadi dam is an earthen dam located on Godavari river at the site of Jayakwadi village in Paithan taluka of Aurangabad district in Maharashtra, India. It is a multipurpose project.  The  water is mainly used  to irrigate agricultural land in the drought-prone Marathwada region of the state. It also provides water for drinking and industrial usage to nearby towns and villages and to the municipalities and industrial areas of Aurangabad and Jalna districts. The surrounding area of the dam has a garden and a bird sanctuary.

History and significance 
A plan to build a dam on Godavari river in the drought-prone Marathwada region was first conceived during rule of state of Hyderabad. The plan was to build a dam in Beed district near Jayakwadi village with storage capacity of 2,147 MCM (million cubic meters). The project came to be known as Jayakwadi project after the name of the village. However, after formation of new state of Maharashtra and comparative analysis on alternative places, it was decided to build a dam 100 km upstream at Paithan. The project was continued to name as Jayakwadi even after it was shifted to a new location. Building dam at higher level made it possible to have longer canals and thus providing irrigation facility to a larger region. The project proposal for this was completed by 1964.

The foundation of the dam was laid by the then Prime minister of India Lal Bahadur Shastri on 18 October 1965. The dam was inaugurated on 24 February 1976 by the then Prime minister Indira Gandhi.

Dam
Jayakwadi is one of the longest earthen dams in Asia. Its height is approx 41.30 m and length of 9.998 km (10 km approx) with total storage capacity 2,909 MCM (million cubic meters) or 102.74 tmc ft. The total catchment area of dam is 21,750 km2. There are total 27 water gates for the dam. Jayakwadi Dam is also called as Nathsagar Dam.

Over its lifetime, it has overflowed 18 times. On 10 August 2006, the highest discharge of 250000 ft3/s was recorded.

Nath Sagar Jalashay
Nath Sagar Jalashay is the name of the reservoir formed by Jayakwadi Dam. Fed by the Godavari and Pravara rivers the reservoir is about 55 km long and 27 km wide and spans over 350 km2. Total submergence area due to the reservoir is approx 36,000 hectares.

Unfortunately siltation has taken a heavy toll on the project. It is estimated that approximately 30% of the dam is filled with silt, reducing its life as well as storage capacity. Survey findings show that from 2003 to 2012,  there was a loss of 31% (that is 8.08 thousand million cubic (TMC) feet) in dead storage and 14% (that is 10.73 TMC) in live storage capacity of the dam due to silt.

Purpose 
Jayakwadi project is a multipurpose project. The main purpose was to irrigate land for agriculture in the drought prone Marathwada region of Maharashtra state. Other important purpose was to provide water for drinking and industrial usage to nearby towns and villages and to the municipalities and industrial areas of Aurangabad and Jalna. 80% of water of dam is allocated for irrigation, 5-7% for drinking water and the rest for industrial purposes. The average daily discharge of the dam is around 1.36 MCM, of which 0.05 MCM of water is supplied to the MIDC area, 0.15 MCM is distributed to fulfill the needs of Aurangabad, while the remaining amount is lost in evaporation.

Irrigation
The Jayakwadi project is one of the largest irrigation projects in Maharashtra Of India . Through its canal system, the dam irrigates cultivable area of 237,452 hectares in the districts of Aurangabad, Jalna, Beed, Ahmednagar and Parbhani. The length of left bank canal is 208 km, the length of right bank canal is 132 km, commanding a total area is 183,858 hectares. The gross irrigated area by 96,000 hectares under right bank canal was further enlarged by constructing Majalgaon Dam which acts as a balancing reservoir in addition to harness the Sindphana tributary of the Godavari river.

Electricity generation
A hydroelectric power plant of 12 MW capacity is installed on the right bank of the river. The water used for power generation is pumped back to the main reservoir from the tail pond using reversible hydro turbine.

During the drought year 2015, the inflows into the reservoir were very meagre due to failure of rains in the catchment area. However nearly 18 tmcft dead storage water available in the reservoir could not be used for the dire needs. With minor external modifications to the exiting reversible hydro turbine unit, most of the dead storage water can be put to use during the drought years by using the hydro power plant for pumping water into the nearby right canal. Water would be released downstream into the tail pond over the spillway (if needed by siphon pipes). Nearly five km long contour canal at MDDL of the right canal in the reservoir area is constructed to connect the power house area with the right canal intake point. The pen stock of the hydro power unit is extended (less than 100 m long) to connect to the contour canal. The hydro power unit is operated in pumping mode to pump water from the tail pond to the right canal when the reservoir level is below the canal's minimum draw down level (MDDL). The pen stock extension piping is detached when water pumping to the canal is not required to restore its normal power generation when the reservoir level is above the right canal's MDDL When the reservoir level is above the right canal MDDL level, the contour canal located in the reservoir area gets submerged without suffering any damage as it is not obstructing the flood flow to the dam spillway.

Industrial use
Around  0.05 MCM water is supplied daily from dam to various industries located in Aurangabad and Jalna MIDC areas. The dam is also a primary source of water to the Parli Thermal Power Station.

Flora and fauna
Aquatic vegetation has species of Chara, Spirogyra, Hydrilla, Potamogeton and Vallisneria. Surrounding  areas  grow Argemone mexicana and Ipomoea carnea. Around 37 species of flora have been reported in the vicinity of reservoir. Seasonal farming (gal pera) is carried out on the exposed land when the waterline recedes.

Dnyaneshwar Udyan
Dnyaneshwar Udyan is one of the largest gardens in Maharashtra resembling the Brindavan Gardens of Mysore. It is spread over 125 hectares and is situated on the banks of Nathsagar Lake formed due to Jayakwadi Dam. It is located near the town of Paithan which is 50 km south of Aurangabad.

Jayakwadi Bird Sanctuary

The Nath Sagar reservoir creates 30 island of various sizes in the shallow waters, with trees for roosting, this provides an ideal shelter for migratory birds. Close to the dam a bird sanctuary has been created which is home for many species of resident and migrant birds. Almost 200 species of birds can be found in this region, which includes more than 70 species of migratory birds. Out of these, 45 chief species are of international migration. Notable amongst migratory birds are cranes, flamingos, pintails, wigeons, shovellers, brahminy ducks, pochards, teals, godwits, and glossy ibises.

Many species are reported in numbers larger than 1% of their bio-geographic population thresholds in Jayakwadi bird sanctuary (Wetlands International Norms – 2002). The Jayakwadi bird sanctuary qualifies for the congregatory criteria A4-i,  A4-iii  and  A4-iv. [ A4i (≥1% biogeographic population), A4iii (≥20,000 water birds), A4iv (known  to exceed  thresholds  set for migratory species) ].

However, the dam's high water levels have resulted in a loss of habitats for the birds, with an environmentalist noting in 2019 that "it could happen that migratory birds from our country and abroad may prefer other water bodies than the bird sanctuary".

See also

Yeldari Dam
Godavari River Basin Irrigation Projects
Marathwada

References

External links

 Godavari Mahamandal

Hydroelectric power stations in Maharashtra
Dams in Aurangabad district, Maharashtra
Dams on the Godavari River
Pumped-storage hydroelectric power stations in India
Dams completed in 1976
1976 establishments in Maharashtra